Sergei (Sergey) Karaulov (born April 15, 1982) is an Uzbekistani-Russian professional basketball player who currently plays for Uralmash Ekaterinburg of the Superleague 1.

Professional career
Start playing in 2001, Karaulov mainly played in Russian Basketball Leagues. Some of the clubs that Karaulov has played with during his pro career include: Krasnye Krylia, Triumph Lybuertsy, Lokomotiv Rostov, Spartak Primorye, Nizhny Novgorod, Khimki and Temp-SUMZ-UGMK Revda.

NBA Draft right
Karaulov was drafted by the San Antonio Spurs, in the second round of the 2004 NBA Draft, with the 58th overall pick of the draft.

National teams
Having dual nationality, Karaulov can represent either Uzbekistan or Russia in international national team competitions. He played for Uzbekistan at the 2001 ABC Championship, and for Russia at the 2007 Summer Universiade.

References

External links
Thedraftreview.com Profile
FIBA.com Profile (game center)
Eurobasket.com Profile

1982 births
Living people
People from Sirdaryo Region
BC Khimki players
BC Krasnye Krylia players
BC Nizhny Novgorod players
BC Samara players
BC Spartak Primorye players
BC Zenit Saint Petersburg players
Centers (basketball)
PBC Lokomotiv-Kuban players
Russian men's basketball players
Uzbekistani men's basketball players
San Antonio Spurs draft picks